Established in 1995, the South East Asia Student Activities Committee (SEASAC) is an association of international schools in and around Southeast Asia.

"The purpose of the organization is to promote student/school activities which provide and encourage opportunities for healthy competition, pursuit of excellence, social and cultural interaction and the development of friendships within the region of South East Asia."

Member Schools

Hong Kong 
 Canadian International School of Hong Kong

Indonesia 
 British School Jakarta

Malaysia 
 Alice Smith School
 Garden International School
 Mont' Kiara International School

Myanmar 
 International School Yangon

Singapore 
 Tanglin Trust School
 United World College of South East Asia (Dover)
 United World College of South East Asia (East)
 Stamford American International School
Australian International School
 German European School Singapore
Singapore American School

Thailand 
 Bangkok Patana School
 NIST International School
 Ruamrudee International School
 Harrow International School

Vietnam 

Saigon South International School

Sports & Activities

Season 1 (Oct - Nov) 
 Football (Division I, II)
 Volleyball (Division I, II)
 Golf
 Cross Country

Season 2 (Jan - Feb) 
 Basketball (Division I, II)
 Boys Rugby
 Girls Touch Rugby (Division I, II)
 Tennis (Division I, II)

Season 3 (Feb - Mar) 
 Badminton (Division I, II, III)
 Swimming (Division I, II)
 Softball
 Gymnastics
 Model United Nations

Others 
 Arts Festival
 Model United Nations

References 

International educational organizations